Aarthi or Aarathi may refer to:

Entertainment
 Aarathi (born 1954), Indian Kannada-language actress
 Aarthi (actress) (born 1987), Indian Tamil-language actress
 Aarthi Agarwal (1984–2015), Indian-American actress who primarily worked in Telugu cinema
 Aarthi Parthasarathy (born 1984), Indian filmmaker and webcomic creator
 Arthi Venkatesh, Indian model and actress who has appeared in Tamil and Malayalam films
 Aarathi (film), a 1981 Malayalam-language film
 Aarthi (TV series), a Tamil-language TV series

Other
 Arti (given name) or Aarthi, a female given name (including a list of persons with the name)
 Aarti or aarthi, a ritual in Hinduism

See also 
 Arti (disambiguation)
 Arathi